Arthur Erdélyi FRS, FRSE (2 October 1908 – 12 December 1977) was a Hungarian-born British mathematician. Erdélyi was a leading expert on special functions, particularly orthogonal polynomials and hypergeometric functions.

Biography
He was born Arthur Diamant in Budapest, Hungary to Ignác Josef Armin Diamant and Frederike Roth. His name was changed to Erdélyi when his mother remarried to Paul Erdélyi. He attended the primary and secondary schools there from 1914 to 1926. His interest in mathematics dates back to this time. Erdélyi was a Jew, and so it was difficult for him to receive a university education in his native Hungary. He travelled to Brno, Czechoslovakia, to obtain a degree in electrical engineering. However, after his flair for mathematics was discovered (he won several prizes in a competition in his first year), he was persuaded to study the subject.

He soon after began to conduct theoretical research into mathematics, and his first paper was published in 1930. At the end of 1936, he had already published 18 papers, and 11 more appeared in 1937. However, due to the German occupation of Czechoslovakia and neighbouring countries, Erdélyi was forced to flee the country.

Erdélyi contacted Edmund Whittaker, a fellow expert in hypergeometric functions, asking for his assistance and soon after, Erdélyi travelled to Edinburgh, Scotland, after receiving £400 for a visa from Whittaker. He joined the University of Edinburgh, and after 2 years there, became a lecturer in the Department of Mathematics (after gaining a DSc in 1940 based on his already extensive published work).

In 1946, after Harry Bateman died, Whittaker was asked to recommend a mathematician who could start the task of publishing Bateman's manuscripts: the Bateman Manuscript Project. Erdélyi was chosen, and in 1947, after becoming a naturalised British citizen, travelled to Caltech, California as a Visiting Professor. He returned to Edinburgh in 1948, only to resign in 1949 to assume the position of Professor of Mathematics at the California Institute of Technology. This was a post he was to hold for the next 15 years, and he retained his citizenship of Britain while in the United States.

In 1964, he returned to Edinburgh as a Professor of Mathematics, a position he held until his death in 1977.

He died in Edinburgh.

Family
He married Eva Neuburg in 1942. They did not have children.

Research
Erdélyi was primarily an expert in special functions, in particular, Lamé functions, hypergeometric functions and orthogonal polynomials. He also contributed to the field of asymptotic analysis, fractional integration and partial differential equations. He introduced the Erdélyi–Kober operators for fractional integration. He wrote two books of high standing - Asymptotic Expansions (1955) (reprinted by Dover) and Operational Calculus and Generalised Functions (1962)

Works
   (xxvi+4 errata pages+302 pages) (NB. With a preface by Mina Rees and a foreword by Earnest C. Watson. Copyright was renewed by California Institute of Technology in 1981.); Reprint: Robert E. Krieger Publishing Co., Inc., Melbourne, Florida, USA. 1981. ; Planned Dover reprint . 
   (xvii+1 errata page+396 pages) (NB. Copyright was renewed by California Institute of Technology in 1981.); Reprint: Robert E. Krieger Publishing Co., Inc., Melbourne, Florida, USA. 1981. ; Planned Dover reprint: .
   (xvii+292+2 pages) (NB. Copyright was renewed by California Institute of Technology in 1983.); Reprint: Robert E. Krieger Publishing Co., Inc., Melbourne, Florida, USA. 1981. ; Planned Dover reprint .
   (xx+391 pages including 1 errata page, red cloth hardcover)
   (xvi+451 pages, red cloth hardcover)
  (vi+108 pages)
  (iii+137 pages)
  (viii+103 pages)

Awards
Erdélyi received several honours, including being elected to the Royal Society as a Fellow in 1975. He also became a fellow of the Royal Society of Edinburgh in 1945, and was also elected a member of the Academy of Sciences of Turin.

References

1908 births
1977 deaths
Mathematicians from Budapest
Hungarian Jews
Jews who immigrated to the United Kingdom to escape Nazism
Fellows of the Royal Society
Fellows of the Royal Society of Edinburgh
California Institute of Technology faculty
Academics of the University of Edinburgh
20th-century British mathematicians
Hungarian refugees
Hungarian expatriates in Czechoslovakia
Hungarian emigrants to the United Kingdom